Clett is a name used for many uninhabited Scottish islets and one to the south, though also in the area inhabited by Vikings. They include -

 One at 58.623644°N 3.5424908°W, near the north coast of Caithness, just to the west Holborn Head north of Scrabster.
 About  to its west is Clett of Thusater, also known as Wester Clett,
 Shetland has two islets named Clett. One is to the south-east of Wells, just south of Westerwick.
 The other islet near Wells lies in Voe of Dale, north-west of it and may have had a promontory fort.
 Another Clett is just off the north-west coast of Skye, north of Isay and just to the west of Waternish. It too is grass covered and has cormorants and shags and is made up of basalt/dolerite columns.
 The only Clett Rock not in Scotland is a rocky islet, just off the Isle of Man coast, near Baldrine.

References

Uninhabited islands of Highland (council area)